Danijela Martinović represented Croatia in the 1998 Eurovision Song Contest after winning the national final selection with the song "Neka mi ne svane".

Before Eurovision

Dora 1998 
Twenty songs were presented in the national final, which was held on 6 March 1998 at the Crystall Ballroom of the Hotel Kvarner in Opatija, accompanied by the big orchestra of Croatian Radio Television. Daniela Trbović and Ljudevit Grgurić Grga hosted the event, and the winning song was chosen primarily by jury voting - 20 juries - one each in the 20 Croatian provinces, plus a 21st jury which came from the votes of the televoting public.

At Eurovision
Heading into the final of the contest, BBC reported that bookmakers ranked the entry joint 12th out of the 25 entries. Danijela performed 1st in the running order on the night of the contest, preceding Greece. At the close of voting "Neka mi ne svane" received 131 points, placing Croatia 5th out of 25 competing countries.

The Croatian televoting awarded its 12 points to the United Kingdom.

Voting

References

1998
Countries in the Eurovision Song Contest 1998
Eurovision